Siggy or Siggie may refer to:

 Siggy Flicker, born Sigalit Paldie, relationship coach and cast member of The Real Housewives of New Jersey (2016–present)
 Sigmund "Siggy" Jackson, Jr. (born 1977), third generation member of the musical Jackson family
 Carol Kendall (writer) (1917-2012), American writer of children's books nicknamed "Siggy"
 Sigurd Lucassen (1927–2001), American labor leader
 Siggie Nordstrom (1893-1980), American model, actress, entertainer, socialite and lead singer of The Nordstrom Sisters
 Sigurd "Siggy" Olaisen, member of the Norwegian thrash metal band Battered
 Siggy, a major character on the American television series Vikings
 an abbreviation for signature block, a block of text automatically appended at the bottom of an email message, Usenet article, or forum post

See also
 Zips or Siggies, a slang term often used as a derogatory slur by Italian American and Sicilian American mobsters
 Siggies, colloquial term for British Army Royal Corps of Signals units
 Ziggy (disambiguation)

Lists of people by nickname